Cedar Creek Township is an inactive township in Wayne County, in the U.S. state of Missouri.

Cedar Creek Township took its name from a creek of the same name within its borders.

References

Townships in Missouri
Townships in Wayne County, Missouri